Ultrasonics is a bimonthly peer reviewed scientific journal published by Elsevier and covering research on theory and application of ultrasonics in physics, biology, chemistry, medicine, underwater acoustics, industry, materials characterization, control, and other disciplines. The journal was established in 1963 and the editor-in-chief is Prof. Zhongqing Su (The Hong Kong Polytechnic University).

Abstracting and indexing 
The journal is abstracted and indexed in:

According to the Journal Citation Reports, the journal has a 2021 impact factor of 4.062.

References

External links 
 

Publications established in 1963
Elsevier academic journals
English-language journals
Acoustics journals
Engineering journals
Bimonthly journals